This page shows the results of the cycling competition at the 2002 Central American and Caribbean Games, held on 24 November to 1 December 2002 in San Salvador, El Salvador.

Medal summary

Men's events

Women's events

References

 

2002 Central American and Caribbean Games
Central American and Caribbean Games
2002
2002 in cycle racing
2002 in track cycling